Ahmed Sher Khan (December 15, 1914 – September, 1982) was an Indian field hockey player who competed in the 1936 Summer Olympics. He was a member of the Indian field hockey team, which won the gold medal. His son Aslam Sher Khan is also a hockey player who was a part of the gold-winning Indian hockey team at the 1975 World Cup.

External links 

1914 births
1982 deaths
Field hockey players from Bhopal
Olympic field hockey players of India
Field hockey players at the 1936 Summer Olympics
Indian male field hockey players
Olympic gold medalists for India
Olympic medalists in field hockey
Medalists at the 1936 Summer Olympics